Natural Bridge State Park is a  state park of Wisconsin, United States, featuring Wisconsin's largest natural arch.  Directly beneath the arch is the Raddatz Rockshelter, a rock shelter once used by Paleo-Indians and now listed on the National Register of Historic Places.  The park is located southwest of Baraboo between the unincorporated communities of Leland and Denzer, in the town of Honey Creek.

Natural history
The park is on the edge of the Baraboo Range in an unglaciated Driftless Area of south-central Wisconsin.  Outcrops of quartzite, hardened sand deposited about 1.6 billion years ago jut out of the tops of these hills.

The arch and rock shelter have been weathered out of one such outcropping.

The park's hills are forested with oak and other hardwoods.  Some ridge tops bear small prairie remnants with grasses and cactus.  Around the outcrop walls grow ferns such as the walking fern (Asplenium rhizophyllum), slender lip fern (Cheilanthes feei) and the rare purple cliffbrake (Pellaea atropurpurea).  The shade of the rock faces also supports Solidago sciaphila, a rare goldenrod.

Cultural history
An archaeological excavation of the rock shelter was conducted in 1957 by Warren L. Wittry of the Wisconsin Historical Society.  His team found evidence of human use over a long time period.  The remains of 50 vertebrate and 15 mollusc species were identified.  The oldest artifacts were pieces of charred wood, presumably from fire pits, which were dated to between 9000 and 8000 BCE.  This would make it the oldest documented site of human occupation in the upper Midwest.  There were also artifacts such as antler-scrapers dating back to six to seven thousand years ago. Evidence indicates that the shelter was used only periodically at first, perhaps as a hunting or seasonal camp.  Later it was inhabited year-round.

The natural bridge has been a tourist attraction for modern visitors since 1870.  The state park was established in 1972, and the following year  centered on the arch were given a further level of protection as Natural Bridge and Rockshelter State Natural Area.  In 1978 the Raddatz Rockshelter was listed on the National Register of Historic Places.

Recreation
Natural Bridge State Park is open year-round but unstaffed.  Visitors needing a parking pass for their vehicle must purchase one from a self-registration stand.  Amenities at the park are limited to picnic tables and restrooms.  There is no overnight camping.

The arch and rock shelter are  short distance up the Indian Moccasin Nature Trail, which then loops further through the wooded hills. Signs along the trail interpret the medicinal uses of many native plants. The longer Whitetail Hiking Trail leads across the highway to the less-used southern half of the park.

The southern portion of the park is open for hunting during parts of autumn.

References

 
Wisconsin Department of Natural Resources. Park signage and the Wisconsin Department of Natural Resources website.

External links

Natural Bridge State Park

Archaeological sites on the National Register of Historic Places in Wisconsin
Driftless Area
Natural arches of Wisconsin
Protected areas established in 1972
Protected areas of Sauk County, Wisconsin
Rock shelters in the United States
State Natural Areas of Wisconsin
State parks of Wisconsin
Articles containing video clips
National Register of Historic Places in Sauk County, Wisconsin
1972 establishments in Wisconsin